"To the Sky" is a song by American electronica project Owl City for the 2010 film Legend of the Guardians: The Owls of Ga'Hoole. It was released as a single on August 31, 2010 via Universal Records and WaterTower Music. "To the Sky" was also featured as a bonus track on the German and Japanese deluxe releases of Owl City's third studio album, All Things Bright and Beautiful.

Background and composition
"To the Sky" was written and produced by Adam Young. He stated that it was an "incredible honor" working on the song for the film. Young also added, "As a fan of both the children's book series growing up, and Zack Snyder's work as a director, having my music included is pretty surreal. I've been waiting for someone to make a movie like this for some time now. I'm endlessly grateful to be involved." The track runs at 175 BPM and is in the key of B major.

Music video
The music video for "To the Sky" premiered on September 15, 2010 via VEVO and was directed by Danny Yourd.

Track listing
Digital download

CD single

Charts

References

External links

2010 songs
Owl City songs
2010 singles